College Hunks Hauling Junk and Moving is a North American junk removal and moving company with headquarters in Tampa, Florida. The company provides junk removal, local and long distance full service moving and office relocation services including in home donation pickup services for non-profit partner organizations. The company became operational in 2005 and began franchising in 2007.
 
The company's services are available to both commercial and residential clients, with over 70% of the "junk" collected being donated to charities such as Goodwill Industries, recycled, reused or incinerated as fuel through the Covanta Energy Corporation.  As of October 2021, College Hunks Hauling Junk and Moving had three company-owned locations and 162 franchised locations in the United States and Canada.

History 
College Hunks Hauling Junk began operations in 2004 after co-founder Omar Soliman won $10,000 in the annual Leigh Rothschild Business Plan Contest. Upon graduating from the University of Miami, Soliman and partner Nick Friedman moved to Washington D.C. and expanded the company into a full-scale operation. In its first two years, the company hauled away more than 4,000 tons of junk, and as of 2010 was hauling away an average of 10,000 tons each year.
 
In 2008, the company moved its headquarters to Tampa, Florida and began franchising. The organization expanded and appeared on the Inc magazine's 500 Fastest Growing Companies list in 2009. The company was ranked #30 on Entrepreneur Magazine's Top 50 New Franchise Rankings in 2009.

In mass media
In September 2008, Friedman and Soliman tried but failed to secure funding from investors for a new business concept called College Foxes Packing Boxes, a full-service packing and professional organizing company. The company attempted to gain an investment of $250,000 for 25% for the "foxes", on the very first episode of the ABC investment television show Shark Tank. The investors requested equity in College HUNKS Hauling Junk instead, with an offer of $1,000,000 for 10%. The show's investors ultimately rejected the offer, except for Robert Herjavec who offered $250,000 for 50% of the Foxes and 10% of the Hunks, which was later rejected by Soliman and Friedman.
 
Soliman and Friedman were contestants in the third-season premiere of Bravo TV's Millionaire Matchmaker hosted by Patti Stanger. Friedman and his girlfriend appeared on HGTV's House Hunters, in an episode that aired on July 7, 2013.
 
College Hunks Hauling Junk was one of the first companies involved in a NIL deal, signing an agreement with then University of Miami quarterback D'Eriq King.

See also
Nick Friedman
Omar Soliman

References 

 

 
Companies based in Tampa, Florida
Franchises
Home improvement
Moving companies of the United States
Transport companies established in 2004
Waste companies established in 2004
Privately held companies based in Florida
Waste management companies of Canada
Waste management companies of the United States
American companies established in 2004